"Hail Mary" is the thirteenth episode and series finale of the American crime comedy-drama television series Terriers. The episode was written by series creator Ted Griffin and Nicholas Griffin, and directed by Ted Griffin. It was first broadcast on FX in the United States on December 1, 2010. Five days after its airing, FX announced the series' cancellation, making the episode the series finale.

The series is set in Ocean Beach, San Diego and focuses on ex-cop and recovering alcoholic Hank Dolworth (Donal Logue) and his best friend, former criminal Britt Pollack (Michael Raymond-James), who both decide to open an unlicensed private investigation business. In the episode, Hank and Britt seek to expose Zeitlin's operations, while Hank is framed for murder.

According to Nielsen Media Research, the episode was seen by an estimated 0.784 million household viewers and gained a 0.3/1 ratings share among adults aged 18–49. The episode received critical acclaim, with critics praising the performances, writing, directing, pacing, and sense of closure. Some expressed that, despite the series eventually getting cancelled, the episode worked as a proper series finale.

Plot
Britt (Michael Raymond-James) is informed that he will face a two-year sentence for brutally attacking Gavin. Warned by Maggie (Jamie Denbo) not to run away, he tries to convince Katie (Laura Allen) to reconcile and flee with him. However, she is aware of the attack and hesitates in fleeing with him. Britt also learns from Ashley (Elizabeth Chomko) that she saw Zeitlin (Michael Gaston) meeting with Robert Lindus and an unknown woman.

As authorities round up suspects in the liquor store deaths, Hank (Donal Logue) convinces Mark (Rockmond Dunbar), who was suspended while Reynolds is under investigation, to help him. They visit Steph (Karina Logue) at her hospital, discovering that Laura (Alison Elliott) is hiding there, also discovering that her source informed her of a Mexican children's hospital related to Zeitlin. Taking her to the station for a testimony, the police arrests Hank; the suspects confessed to the shooting and claimed that Hank hired them to kill Jason. Hank talks with Gretchen (Kimberly Quinn), claiming he is innocent. Gretchen believes him, telling him to defend himself.

Hank is driven by a cruiser to the station, where Zeitlin supposedly hired people to kill him. However, the cruiser diverts from its route and releases Hank. The cruiser's cops are friends of Mark, who meets with him. Hank, Britt and Laura then go to Tijuana to meet with Eleanor Gosney (Rachel Miner), her source. Eleanor says that her father collaborated with a person from the Mexican hospital and retrieved vital information. The information was on his jacket, which is now on Hank's house. Hank and Britt return to Ocean Beach, where Hank sneaks into his house to retrieve the jacket. He is confronted by Mr. Burke (Daren Scott), who coldly admits to supplying Mickey with the drugs. They engage in a brutal fight, which culminates when Hank kills Mr. Burke.

The next day, Hank and Britt confront Zeitlin at his boat. Holding him at gunpoint, he confesses to ordering Jason's death, but claims to work for other important people. He identifies the man in the Mexican hospital as Tom Cutshaw (Neal McDonough), his boss. They confront Cutshaw at a restaurant, telling him to stop the airport development. To further encourage him, Hank threatens to reveal incriminating photographs of Cutshaw, telling him to move the airport development somewhere else. With no other choice, Cutshaw accepts to his terms.

With the new evidence, Zeitlin is arrested, while the suspects in prison change their testimony to exonerate Hank, who has decided to further investigate Cutshaw. Hank also reconciles with Gretchen, and plans on selling his house again. Britt tells Katie that he will accept responsibility for his actions and will go to prison. He asks her to destroy the paternity test, wanting to be the child's father no matter what. He then leaves with Hank, who will take him to prison. As Hank drives, he states he shouldn't go to prison, suggesting they could flee to Mexico, something that interests him. As they stop on a red light, Hank gives him the choice: go forward and go to prison, or turn left and go to Mexico. As the light turns green, Hank asks Britt to decide which road take.

Reception

Viewers
The episode was watched by 0.784 million viewers, earning a 0.3/1 in the 18-49 rating demographics on the Nielson ratings scale. This means that 0.3 percent of all households with televisions watched the episode, while 1 percent of all households watching television at that time watched it. This was a 44% increase in viewership from the previous episode, which was watched by 0.542 million viewers with a 0.2/1 in the 18-49 rating demographics.

Critical reviews
"Hail Mary" received critical acclaim. Matt Fowler of IGN gave the episode an "amazing" 9 out of 10 rating and wrote, "Im in a sort of absolute, almost dangerous, denial about this show probably not getting picked up for a Season 2. I know there's some bold writing on the wall but I'm just not ready to say goodbye to these characters. I love the way that Hank left things with both Laura and Gretchen. Logue has been pitch-perfect in this role and has shown us just how vibrant and vital the PI genre can truly be in this day and age. There are tons of 'blue sky' shows out there that feature heroes sticking up for the swindled little guy, but this show has grounded that time-honored tale in a world of the disheveled, flawed underdog."

Noel Murray of The A.V. Club gave the episode an "A-" grade and wrote, "If nothing else, the Terriers season one finale 'Hail Mary' succeeds at doing more with the resolution of its season-long master-plot than just crossing all the Ts. It's not a perfect send-off. Some of the machinations required to keep our heroes out of jail and on the case stuck me as a little implausible, and while I don't have a problem with the 11th-hour introduction of a previously unseen villain, I felt like the big showdown between Hank and the mysterious Tom Cutshaw was too rushed and squandered both the magnificent Neal McDonough and some crackling Griffin brothers dialogue. But then came the epilogue, which was so, so satisfying. Almost painfully so." Ken Tucker of Entertainment Weekly wrote, "Terriers wrapped up its first season on Wednesday night with a highly satisfying episode and an open-ended conclusion that did not feel like a cheat or a tease. While I've made clear my reservations about the series in a previous post, I thought the last three episodes of Terriers were excellent, and am solidly in the please-FX-renew-it camp."

Alan Sepinwall of HitFix wrote, "But it wasn't just that there was room for so much plot and appearances by so many characters. It's that 'Hail Mary' was so packed with great moment after great moment, featuring that usual Terriers mix of the comic, the tragic, the thrilling and the heartbreaking." James Poniewozik of TIME wrote, "Despite its ratings, I believe there's still that chance that FX will realize it had a series too charming, well-written, and simply good to take off the air. But while there is a temptation to write strategically and pretend otherwise, honesty requires me to note that if 'Hail Mary' were Terriers last episode ever, the series would have gone out on a fitting and remarkable note."

Matt Richenthal of TV Fanatic gave the episode a 4.8 star rating out of 5 and wrote, "We're in. We're invested. We've enjoyed a season that has played out like a well-paced movie or novel. Even if we never see Hank and Britt joke around in their truck again, the 13 hours spent watching this show over the last few months won't feel like time wasted. Far from it." Cory Barker of TV Overmind wrote, "Just know that 'Hail Mary' feels like a damn fitting ending to Terriers season one, whether it's the final episode ever or not. It's hopeful and heartfelt with just enough attitude and bite to avoid any cheese. It makes all the small moments feel like big moments. And it's a great end to one of the big introductory season of recent memory."

References

External links
 

2010 American television episodes
Terriers episodes
American television series finales